40 Dayz & 40 Nightz is the second studio album by American rapper Xzibit. It was released on August 25, 1998 by Loud Records and RCA Records.

The album featured four singles "What U See Is What U Get", "3 Card Molly", "Los Angeles Times" and "Pussy Pop". "What U See Is What U Get"  earned Xzibit some of the highest charting placements in his career.

Track listing

Chart positions

Singles

References

1998 albums
Horrorcore albums
Albums produced by Bud'da
Albums produced by Soopafly
Xzibit albums
RCA Records albums
Loud Records albums